Masindi is a town in the Western Region of Uganda. It is on the road between Kampala and the Murchison Falls National Park.  It is the site of the headquarters of the Masindi District.

Location

The coordinates of Masindi are 1°41'01.0"N, 31°43'20.0"E (Latitude:1.683611; Longitude:31.722222). Masindi Town lies at an average elevation  of above sea level.

Population
According to the 2002 national census, the population of Masindi was about 28,300. In 2010, the Uganda Bureau of Statistics (UBOS) estimated the population at 43,000. In 2011, UBOS estimated the mid-year population at 45,400. The national population census conducted in August 2014 put the population at 94,622.

In 2020, UBOS estimated the mid-year population of Masindi Town at 110,000 people. The population agency calculated that the population of the town grew at an average rate of 2.72 percent annually, between 2014 and 2020.

History
As capital of Bunyoro, Masindi was visited by Samuel and Florence Baker, British explorers and anti-slavery campaigners, from 25 April 1872 to 14 June 1873. The Baker expedition was forced to withdraw because of the hostility of the Omukama Kabaléga, the King of Bunyoro at the time. The White Fathers founded here a mission in the 1910s. The town was developed as a commercial centre due to trade in cotton during the second half of the 19th century.

Points of interest

Challenges
A profile of the town written by the New Vision newspaper identified three major challenges. The first challenge was the inadequacy of income-generating projects outside of the town centre. Three out of four divisions in town; Kigulya, Karujubu and Nyagahya are unable to generate enough revenue to meet service demands. The second major challenge is the inadequacy of sanitation services. The town had five public toilets, as of November 2013, and all of them were located in the town's Central division. Masindi is serviced by National Water and Sewerage Corporation, but the services are concentrated in the town centre. The third major challenge for the town of Masindi is that of garbage disposal. The town lacked adequate funding to hire staff and purchase fuel to dispose of the town's garbage. However, the Central government had provided equipment to carry out the task.

See also
Bunyoro
Bunyoro sub-region
Murchison Falls
List of cities and towns in Uganda

References

External links

About Masindi Town

Masindi District
Populated places in Western Region, Uganda
Bunyoro sub-region